The Office of the Legislative Assembly of Ontario, also called the Office of the Assembly, is an organization mandated to support the Speaker of the Legislative Assembly of Ontario and the legislature's Members of Provincial Parliament in the exercise of their parliamentary duties.

Independent of the Government of Ontario, the Office of the Assembly provides administrative and procedural services to all MPPs, as well as operational support for the daily activities of the Legislative Assembly of Ontario and its committees.

Other offices of the Legislative Assembly
 Auditor General of Ontario
 Office of the Chief Electoral Officer
 Office of the Information and Privacy Commissioner
 Office of the Integrity Commissioner
 Office of the Ombudsman of Ontario

References 

Offices of the Legislative Assembly of Ontario